The Assam Tea Planters' Association Shield, commonly known as the A.T.P.A. Shield, is an annual Indian association football tournament held in Jorhat, Assam and organised by Jorhat District Sports Association (JDSA). It is one of the esteemed and the third oldest football tournament of Assam after Independence Day Cup and Bordoloi Trophy. Since its inception in 1955, along with the best teams from northeast India many top clubs of the country like Mohammedan SC, Mohun Bagan AC (both from Kolkata) and Dempo SC (Goa) have also participated in this leading tournament. The tournament was donated and hosted by Assam Tea Planters' Association (ATPA). From 1968, the tournament is organising by Jorhat District Sports Association.

Venue
The matches of A.T.P.A. Shield are played at Jorhat Stadium in Jorhat.

Results

References

Football in Assam
Football cup competitions in India
1955 establishments in India
Recurring sporting events established in 1955